People's Union Church (also known as Scambler Union United Church of Christ) is a historic church in Scambler Township, Minnesota, United States. Uniquely, it was founded in 1915 and maintained by a society of local women as a non-denominational house of worship.  The church building was added to the National Register of Historic Places in 2004.  The congregation is currently affiliated with the United Church of Christ (UCC).

References

United Church of Christ churches in Minnesota
Churches on the National Register of Historic Places in Minnesota
Churches completed in 1915
Buildings and structures in Otter Tail County, Minnesota
National Register of Historic Places in Otter Tail County, Minnesota
History of women in Minnesota